Pulwa ( - Pul'va) is a river of Poland and Belarus, a tributary of the Bug River. Its source is near the village Werpol, eastern Poland. It crosses the Belarusian border, flows through the towns Vysokaye, Aharodniki and Voŭčyn, and joins the Bug near Stavy, on the border with Poland.

Rivers of Poland
Rivers of Podlaskie Voivodeship
Rivers of Brest Region
Rivers of Belarus